The Borough of Brentwood is a local government district and borough in Essex in the East of England.

History and geography

The borough is named after its main town of Brentwood. There are still large areas of woodland including Shenfield Common, Hartswood (named after its last private owner, a Mr. Hart), Weald Country Park, and Thorndon Country Park. The original district council was formed in 1974 from the former area of Brentwood Urban District, part of Epping and Ongar Rural District and part of Chelmsford Rural District. By royal charter, the district became a borough on 27 April 1993.

Politics

The council has 37 councilors, divided between 15 wards with between 1 and 3 councilors. Following the United Kingdom local elections in 2021 the political composition of Brentwood Borough Council is as follows:

Boundaries

Brentwood is bordered by Epping Forest district (to the north-west), Chelmsford (north-east), Basildon district (south-east), Thurrock (south, aligned with the London, Tilbury and Southend line and the London Borough of Havering (south-west).

Transport
The main transport links run in a southwest to north-east direction through the borough with other important links running west to east. Shenfield and Ingatestone provide long-distance trains to Colchester, Ipswich, and other long-distance destinations. However Brentwood is served by TfL-run Elizabeth line trains between London Liverpool Street and Shenfield. Also within the borough is West Horndon which provides direct trains to London Fenchurch Street and Southend-on-Sea.

A major artery running through the borough is the A12 dual-carriageway, running from London to Chelmsford, then Colchester, the ports of Harwich and Felixstowe, Ipswich, Lowestoft, and finally Great Yarmouth. The old Roman road (A1023) goes right through the centre of Brentwood and joins the A12 (that bypasses the town) at the far ends of Brentwood. Within different parts of Brentwood, the A1023 is called (from west to east) Brook Street, London Road, High Street, Shenfield Road, and Chelmsford Road.  The other main road is the A127 which separates from the A12 near Romford and then proceeds easterly to Southend-on-Sea.

Media 

The borough is served by dedicated radio stations, Phoenix FM and Time 107.5.

Education

Secondary schools
Anglo European School
Brentwood County High School
Brentwood School
Brentwood Ursuline Convent School
Becket Keys
Shenfield High School
St Martin's School

Primary schools
Bentley St. Paul's Church of England School
Blackmore Primary School
Doddinghurst CofE Junior School
Doddinghurst Infant School
Hogarth Primary School
Holly Trees Primary School
Hutton All Saints Church of England Primary School
Ingatestone and Fryerning Church of England Primary School
Ingatestone Infant School
Ingrave Johnstone Church of England Primary School
Kelvedon Hatch Community Primary School
Larchwood Primary School
Long Ridings Primary School
Mountnessing Church of England Primary School
St. Helen's Catholic Infant School
St. Helen's Catholic Junior School
St. Joseph the Worker Roman Catholic Primary School
St. Mary's Church of England Primary School
St. Peter's Church of England Primary School
St. Thomas of Canterbury Church of England Infant School
St. Thomas of Canterbury Church of England Junior School
Warley Primary School
West Horndon Primary School
Willowbrook Primary School (formerly Brookfield School)

Special schools
The Endeavour School
Grove House School

Civil parishes and settlements in the borough

Unparished
Brentwood
Childerditch
Great Warley
Havering's Grove
Hutton
Little Warley
Pilgrims Hatch
Shenfield
South Weald
Warley

Parished
Blackmore, Hook End and Wyatts Green
Blackmore
Hook End
Wyatts Green
Doddinghurst
Ingatestone and Fryerning
Ingatestone
Fryerning
Kelvedon Hatch
Mountnessing
Navestock
Stondon Massey
Herongate and Ingrave
Herongate
Ingrave
West Horndon

Twinning
Brentwood is twinned with Roth bei Nürnberg in Germany and Montbazon in France.

Arms

References

 
Non-metropolitan districts of Essex
Boroughs in England